Rów may refer to the following places:
Rów, Pomeranian Voivodeship (north Poland)
Rów, Warmian-Masurian Voivodeship (north Poland)
Rów, West Pomeranian Voivodeship (north-west Poland)